Murtaugh may refer to:
Murtaugh, Idaho, a town in southern Idaho, USA
Murtaugh Peak, a mountain in Antarctica
"Murtaugh" (How I Met Your Mother), an episode of How I Met Your Mother

People with the surname
Danny Murtaugh (1917–1976), American professional baseball player
John F. Murtaugh (1874–1918), American lawyer and politician from New York
Tim Murtaugh (born 1943), American professional baseball player and manager

Fictional
Roger Murtaugh, a character in the Lethal Weapon film series
 Alexia Murtaugh, a fictional character in the webcomic Schlock Mercenary